This is a list of episodes from the seventh season of Hawaii Five-O.

Broadcast history
The season originally aired Tuesdays at 9:00-10:00 pm (EST).

DVD release
The season was released on DVD by Paramount Home Video.

Episodes

References

07
1974 American television seasons
1975 American television seasons